is a retired Japanese footballer.

Club stats
Updated to 23 February 2018.

References

External links
Profile at Sagan Tosu

1984 births
Living people
Fukuoka University alumni
Association football people from Fukuoka Prefecture
Japanese footballers
J1 League players
J2 League players
Sagan Tosu players
Tokushima Vortis players
Association football goalkeepers